Oreorchis patens, the common oreorchis or 山兰 (shan lan), is a species of orchid native to eastern Asia. It is known from Japan, Korea, the Russian Far East, and China. The common oreorchis is a terrestrial orchid with a sympodial habit of growth; it flowers on an inflorescence bearing yellow blooms.

Description

Oreorchis patens is a terrestrial, perennial herb spreading by means of pseudobulbs. Its pseudobulbs are egg-shaped, and carry two or three nodes that eventually develop into separate growths; the chain of pseudobulbs is connected by a short rhizome. They gradually taper at base into an indistinct petiole-like stalk, and are pointed at the apex. The flowers are yellowish brown to pale yellow, and the lip is white, often with purple spots. The sepals are narrowly oblong, with apices slightly blunt; the lateral sepals are slightly curved like a sickle and wider than the dorsal sepal. The petals are narrowly oblong, and slightly curved, with the apices pointed. Both the sepals and petals have 3-5 veins. The lip is oval-shaped with the base narrower, ; it is tri-lobed and shortly clawed at base. The callus consists of a pair of thick lamellae, extending from base to midway along the mid-lobe. The plant flowers from June to July, and its capsules ripen from September to October. The diploid number of the species is 2n = 48.

Taxonomy and naming
John Lindley first described the common oreorchis as Corallorhiza patens from a Russian specimen in 1840, noting that its floral structure was similar to that of the mycoheterotrophic genus Corallorhiza but that it possessed leaves. In 1859, he proposed the new genus Oreorchis for this species, along with two other species in his possession, feeling that they were distinct because of the presence of leaves and their globular, uncompressed pollinia attached to a "true caudicle with its gland."

Several other species in the genus were subsequently described, many of which have been subsumed within O. patens. K.Y. Lang (1994) and N. Pearce and P. Cribb (1997) synonymized O. lancifolia and O. setschuanica with O. patens based on their virtually indistinguishable morphology. O. yunnanensis was synonymized based on the type description and habitat; physical specimens were difficult to obtain. O. patens var. confluens was described by Schlechter in 1921 as bearing a lip with convergent keels joined at the apex; Pearce and Cribb treated this feature as a local variation and likewise synonymized it with the parent species. Interestingly, Pearce and Cribb regarded O. gracilis and its synonyms as O. patens var. gracilis based on Taiwanese and Japanese bifoliate individuals. They also challenged the Maekawa (1935) splitting of O. coreana and its synonyms into a separate genus, Diplolabellum, but did not synonymize the species with O. patens. As of 2020, both O. patens var. gracilis and O. coreana are regarded as synonyms of O. patens by Kew.

Distribution and habitat
The common oreorchis is known from Japan, Korea, the Russian Far East (Kamchatka, Primorye, Sakhalin, Kuril Islands), and China (Gansu, Guizhou, Heilongjiang, Henan, Hunan, Jiangxi, Jilin, Liaoning, Sichuan, Taiwan, and Yunnan). The hoverflies Episyrphus balteatus and Sphaerophoria menthastri have been known to pollinate O. patens.

References

Calypsoinae
Flora of Korea
Orchids of Asia
Plants described in 1840